George Douglas (born George Lamar Hesselberg; August 7, 1903 – June 11, 1983) was an American actor. He was born as the younger brother of the actor Melvyn Douglas. Their mother was Lena Priscilla (née Shackelford) and their father Edouard Gregory Hesselberg, a concert pianist and composer. His father was a Jewish immigrant from Riga, Latvia. His mother, a native of Tennessee, was Protestant and a Mayflower descendant. His maternal grandfather, George Shackelford, was a general and Civil War veteran. He was the granduncle of Illeana Douglas, also an actress.

He appeared on Gunsmoke in 1959 as a “Man” in the episode “Wind” (S4E28).

He died in San Diego, California, United States, in June 1983.

Filmography

References

External links 

 

20th-century American male actors
American male film actors
People from Macon, Georgia
1983 deaths
1903 births
Male actors from Georgia (U.S. state)
American people of Latvian-Jewish descent